Pterosturisoma microps is the only species of the monotypic genus Pterosturisoma, a genus of the family Loricariidae of catfish (order Siluriformes).

This species is endemic to Peru where it is found in the upper Amazon basin. P. microps is a rheophile, which means it likes fast-moving water.

P. microps reaches a length of  SL. Pterosturisoma appears morphologically very similar to Lamontichthys; however, Pterosturisoma has 6 pectoral fin rays while Lamontichthys has 7. These two genera share features with Sturisoma such as similar body depth at the dorsal fin origin, the presence of filamentous extensions on caudal fin spines, and complete abdominal plate cover that extends to the lower lip margin. The sexes of P. microps can be distinguished by the width of a naked trapezoidal area framed by four bony plates in the genital region; this area appeared broader in females, and longer and narrower in males.

References

Harttiini
Fish of South America
Freshwater fish of Peru
Fish of the Amazon basin
Monotypic freshwater fish genera
Catfish genera
Taxa named by Isaäc J. H. Isbrücker
Taxa named by Han Nijssen